Beaumont School may refer to:

Beaumont School (Ohio)
Beaumont School (St Albans)
Beaumont College, a former Roman Catholic school near Windsor